Under the Same Roof is a 2019 Spanish comedy film directed by  and starring Silvia Abril and Jordi Sánchez. It is produced by Feelgood Media and Lanube Películas, and distributed by Sony Pictures Internacional Productions.

Cast

See also 
 List of Spanish films of 2019

References

External links
 

Spanish comedy films
2019 comedy films
2019 films
Sony Pictures films
Films shot in Madrid
2010s Spanish-language films
2010s Spanish films